The 2019 Big East Conference women's soccer tournament was the postseason women's soccer tournament for the Big East Conference held from November 3 through November 10, 2019. The five-match tournament took place at campus sites, with the higher seed hosting each game. The six-team single-elimination tournament consisted of three rounds based on seeding from regular season conference play. The defending champions were the Georgetown Hoyas. However, they were unable to defend their crown, losing to Xavier 2–0 in the final.  This is the first title in program history for Xavier, and the first for head coach Nate Lie.

Bracket

Schedule

Quarterfinals

Semifinals

Final

Statistics

Goalscorers 
1 Goal
 Amanda Carolan (Georgetown)
 Shannon Casey (Villanova)
 Hayley Jakovich (Xavier)
 Carrie Lewis (Xavier)
 Kelly Livingstone (Georgetown)
 Gabrielle LoPresti (Xavier)
 Hannah McNulty (Providence)
 Anja Savich (Butler)
 Brooke Sroka (Xavier)

All-Tournament team

Source:

* Offensive MVP
^ Defensive MVP

References 

 
Big East Conference Women's Soccer Tournament